The Philipse Patent was a British royal patent for a large tract of land on the east bank of the Hudson River about 50 miles north of New York City.  It was purchased in 1697 by Adolphus Philipse, a wealthy landowner of Dutch descent in the Province of New York, and in time became today's Putnam County. 

Philipse bought the roughly  tract from two Dutch traders who had purchased it from "Wiccopee chiefs" of the Wappinger native American people.  Originally known as the Highland Patent, it spanned from the Hudson to the then Connecticut Colony along today's northern Westchester County border.

In 1731 it was incorporated into Dutchess County, and divided in 1754 among three heirs, but remained in the Loyalists Philipse family until seized in 1779 during the Revolution. The Commissioners of Forfeiture of the Revolutionary Province of New York auctioned it in parcels, without compensation to its prior owners.  In spite of a provision requiring restitution in the 1783 Treaty of Paris, it never was made.  In 1812, the southern part of Dutchess County, including all of what had been the Phillipse Patent, was spun off into a newly created Putnam County.

History

Purchase
The first step to establishing rights to real estate at the time was usually to apply to the colonial government for a license to purchase a tract of land from local Native American inhabitants. Natives typically had notions of communal sharing of land resources and did not understand that by such sales the buyers intended to acquire the right to exclude the native sellers from all access to the land. On December 2, 1680, Dutch traders Lambert Dorlandt and Jan Sybrant (Seberinge) applied to the New York Colonial government for such a license and on July 15, 1691 "purchased" a large tract of land that embraced nearly all of what is today Putnam county from local Native Americans, including Wiccopee chiefs. Dortlandt and Sybrant did not then themselves obtain the land patent from the governor but in 1697 sold their rights to the land to Adolphus Philipse, a wealthy merchant. 

Adolphus was the second son of Frederick Philipse, the first Lord of the Manor of Philipsborough, a Dutch immigrant to North America of Bohemian heritage who had risen to become one of the greatest landholders in New Netherland. and extended approximately 13 miles along the east shore of the Hudson River, from Annsville Creek to the Fish Kill, and eastward some 20 or so miles to the border of the Colony of Connecticut, including Pollopel Island in the Hudson.

Shortly after purchasing it, Adolphus Philipse, whose residence was the Castle Philipse near North Tarrytown (now, Sleepy Hollow, New York), and who maintained only a bachelor shooting lodge on Lake Mahopac in the Highland Patent, opened the tract to tenant settlers. Thus began a policy that lasted throughout his lifetime and his heirs' so long as they owned the land, to rent rather than sell, a practice which led to stunted growth for two and a half centuries to come.

A surveying error during the establishment of the border between the provinces of New York and the Connecticut Colony resulted in a portion of a disputed tract known as The Oblong spanning the entire eastern border of the Patent. The proper boundaries were not resolved until a land swap between the then U.S. states late in the 18th century.

Inheritance
Upon Frederick's death in 1702, Adolphus inherited a partial share of the Manor's lands, which then amounted to over 80 square miles and encompassed the bulk of today's lower Westchester County. The title and balance of the lands passed to his nephew, Frederick Philipse II, whose father Philip, elder brother of Adolphus, had predeceased Frederick I.

Division
Adolphus Philipse died in 1750 (Smith, 1749), with his share of the Manor and the Highland Patent he had acquired on his own passing to Frederick II, his only heir-at-law. Upon Frederick II's death in 1751, the Manor went to his son Frederick Philipse III, while the Patent was divided among four of Frederick II's offspring: son Philip, and daughters, Susannah (wife of Beverley Robinson), Mary (wife of Col. Roger Morris), and Margaret, who died intestate. 

By terms of her father's will Margaret's portion was then equally divided among her brother and sisters. Based upon a 1751 survey, the tract was geographically divided on the 7th of Feb 1754 into nine Lots as seen in the preserved undated pen and ink map: three on the river, three in the interior, and three on the eastern border abutting The Oblong. Each of the three heirs inherited a lot in each division.

Tenant uprising
Tenants in the Philipse Patent joined others throughout the Province of New York in rising against their landlords beginning in the early 1760s.  This reached a peak in 1766, when a tenant in the northeast of Mary Philipse's center parcel, William Prendergast, fomented a small army of 2,000 men to forcibly wrest freedom from paying rent on the lands they occupied.  It marched on New York City, where it petitioned the colonial Governor Sir Henry Moore to intercede, who refused, and – seemingly – defused the unrest.

The landlords, however, incited by the uprising, pressured Moore to dispatch 300 soldiers north to restore order, defeat the rebels, and capture their leader.  Royal grenadiers were dispatched from Poughkeepsie, and, after skirmishes en route, resulting in several dead on each side, engaged Prendergast and 50 of his men at the Oblong Meeting House in the Gore, earning their surrender.  Ultimately, Prendergast was tried in New York City, convicted of treason, and sentenced to be hanged.

He was to be executed on September 28, 1766. However, with the aid of the presiding judge, Chief Justice Daniel Horsmanden, Pendergast's wife, Mehetibel Wing Pendergast, was able to persuade Governor Moore to seek a king's pardon. It was granted by His Majesty George III, in the belief that clemency would have a more beneficial effect in quelling the dispute and restoring respect for authority among the citizenry than punishment.

Seizure
Frederick  was a Loyalist during the American Revolution. As such, he was attained by the Provincial Congress of New York in 1779 and his Manor and other lands in today's Westchester County were seized.  Several months later their sale was ordered.

Philipse family holdings belonging to other members, principally the Highland Patent, were also seized by the Commissioners of Forfeitures.  Sale was withheld during the war, as its outcome was uncertain, confiscated lands had been pledged as collateral against monies borrowed by the provisional government to finance the conflict, and tenants lobbied for the right of preemptive purchase of leased land.

The sale proceeded after the Revolution ended.  In spite of assurances of restitution in the 1783 Treaty of Paris signed with the British, and the enormous sum raised – the better part of a quarter of a million pounds Sterling – New York's Provisional Congress reneged and no compensation was forthcoming. 

Several thousand acres of the Philipse estate went to the tenant farmers who worked on the land. In all, the lands were divided up into almost 200 different parcels, with the bulk of the holdings going to Dutch New York businessman Henry Beekman.

In 1787, a British court decided that the inheritance rights of heirs to property that was confiscated by the Americans during the American Revolution was recoverable. Under this decision, John Jacob Astor I purchased the reversionary rights to the Philipse lands in 1809 from the heirs of Roger Morris (husband of Mary Philipse) for £20,000. After Mary Philipse Morris died in 1825, Astor attempted to collect rents on the lands, but the new “owners,” who had purchased from the lands from the Commission of Forfeiture, refused to pay, and Astor tried to evict them. A compromise was reached in 1828 when New York State compensated Astor for the reversionary rights in the amount of $500,000.

Incorporation

The Highland Patent had been incorporated into Dutchess County in 1737, where it was known as the "South Precinct." In 1806 a very small portion north of the Hudson Highlands by the mouth of Fishkill Creek was split off from Philipstown (which had been established in 1788 out of the westernmost three and part of a fourth parcel of the Philipse Patent) and given to the Town of Fishkill.  In 1812 the balance of the Philipse Patent was separated from Dutchess County and became today's Putnam County.

Gallery

See also

The Oblong
 Dutchess County land patents

References

External links
 Putnam County Online: Putnam's past
 Putnam County Online: Boundary changes of Putnam County

Hudson River
Border irregularities of the United States
Geography of Dutchess County, New York
Geography of Putnam County, New York